"Don't Kill the Whale" is a single by the band Yes, released from their 1978 album Tormato. It reached number 36 on the UK Singles Chart.

Content 
The song, as with most of the album's tracks, was short compared to the songs on Yes's 1973 album Tales from Topographic Oceans. Its style and lyrics make it "an unusually direct song for the group with its topical message", according to the band's website. However, that shift in style only helped make it a minor hit.

Personnel
 Jon Anderson – lead vocals
 Steve Howe – guitar
 Rick Wakeman – polymoog, birotron
 Chris Squire – piano, bass guitar, backing vocals
 Alan White – drums

Charts

References

1978 songs
Atlantic Records singles
Songs written by Jon Anderson
Songs written by Chris Squire
Yes (band) songs